Ishion Hutchinson is a Jamaican poet and essayist.

Biography
Hutchinson was born in Port Antonio, Jamaica. He received a BA from the University of the West Indies, an MFA from New York University, and completed graduate studies at the University of Utah.

His poetry and essays have appeared in Ploughshares, Poetry Review (UK), Narrative, New Letters, Granta, Gulf Coast, The Huffington Post, The Wolf (UK), Prairie Schooner, Attica, Caribbean Review of Books, and the LA Review.

He currently teaches courses in poetry and creative writing at Cornell University and serves as contributing editor to the literary journal, Tongue: A Journal of Writing & Art.

Awards and honors
His first collection, Far District, published by Peepal Tree Press (UK), won the 2011 PEN/Joyce Osterweil Award for Poetry. Hutchinson is also the recipient of the 2013 Whiting Award and the 2011 Academy of American Poets' Larry Levis Prize. His 2016 collection, House of Lords and Commons won the National Book Critics Circle Award for poetry. He won a 2019 Windham–Campbell Literature Prize in Poetry.

Bibliography

Poetry 
Collections
 
 
List of poems

References

External links
Author Website
Profile at The Whiting Foundation
 Ishion Hutchinson and Teju Cole In Conversation: "Landscape on Which Memory Falls". Work In Progress, March 2017.

Year of birth missing (living people)
Living people
21st-century Jamaican poets
21st-century essayists
21st-century male writers
Cornell University faculty
Jamaican essayists
Jamaican male poets
Male essayists
New York University alumni
People from Portland Parish
The New Yorker people
University of Utah alumni
University of the West Indies alumni